This article shows the rosters of all participating teams at the men's goalball tournament at the 2012 Summer Paralympics in London.

Pool A

The following is the Brazil roster in the men's goalball tournament of the 2012 Summer Paralympics.

The following is the Finland roster in the men's goalball tournament of the 2012 Summer Paralympics.

The following is the Great Britain roster in the men's goalball tournament of the 2012 Summer Paralympics.

The following is the Lithuania roster in the men's goalball tournament of the 2012 Summer Paralympics.

The following is the Sweden roster in the men's goalball tournament of the 2012 Summer Paralympics.

The following is the Turkey roster in the men's goalball tournament of the 2012 Summer Paralympics.

Pool B

The following is the Algeria roster in the men's goalball tournament of the 2012 Summer Paralympics.

The following is the Belgium roster in the men's goalball tournament of the 2012 Summer Paralympics.

The following is the Canada roster in the men's goalball tournament of the 2012 Summer Paralympics.

The following is the China roster in the men's goalball tournament of the 2012 Summer Paralympics.

The following is the Iran roster in the men's goalball tournament of the 2012 Summer Paralympics.

The following is the South Korea roster in the men's goalball tournament of the 2012 Summer Paralympics.

See also
Goalball at the 2012 Summer Paralympics – Women's team rosters

References

2
Men's team rosters